Centaur Chiron may refer to:

 Chiron, a centaur in Greek mythology
 2060 Chiron, a centaur in astronomy